Roger William Brown (May 22, 1942 – March 4, 1997) was an American professional basketball player and councilman. A unanimous ABA All-Time Team selection, he was inducted into the Naismith Memorial Basketball Hall of Fame in 2013.

High school
A 6'5" (1.96 m) forward/guard, Brown starred at Brooklyn's George W. Wingate High School.

College career 
Brown signed to play for the University of Dayton in 1960, but he was banned from the National Collegiate Athletic Association (NCAA) and National Basketball Association (NBA) when it was revealed that while still in high school and along with fellow Brooklyn star Connie Hawkins, he had been introduced to a gambler, Jack Molinas, who was involved in illegal point shaving. Brown was never accused of point shaving and his only crime was associating with Molinas.

Professional career 

With the NCAA and NBA ban in place, he continued to play basketball in Dayton's amateur leagues, and in 1967 signed with the American Basketball Association (ABA)'s Indiana Pacers. He was the first player the Pacers organization signed when they were formed.

Over his eight-year (1967–1975) ABA career, spent with the Pacers, Memphis Sounds, and Utah Stars, Brown scored 10,498 points, appeared in four All-Star games. On March 11, 1969, Brown set a Pacers franchise record with 46 points scored in a single game, during a win over the New York Nets. That postseason, during the 1969 ABA Finals, Brown averaged 25.6 points, 6.6 rebounds, and 2.6 assists a game, in a five game series loss to Warren Jabali and the Oakland Oaks. The following postseason, during the 1970 ABA Playoffs, Brown was named Playoffs MVP after he averaged a postseason career best 28.5 points a game en route to a finals victory over the Los Angeles Stars, in which Brown scored 45 points and grabbed 11 rebounds in a decisive Game 6 victory. Brown would go on to win two more championships with the Pacers. The NBA later reinstated Brown, but he chose to never play in the league. Later Pacers player and hall of famer Reggie Miller considers Brown the greatest player to never play in the NBA.

Brown was one of seven players unanimously selected to the ABA All-Time Team in 1997. He is one of four players (the others are Miller, George McGinnis, and Mel Daniels) to have his jersey (#35) retired by the Pacers.

On February 15, 2013, Brown was announced as one of five direct inductees to join the Naismith Hall of Fame, having been elected by the Hall's ABA Committee. He was inducted in September 2013.

Later life and death
During his basketball career, Brown served as a Republican on the Indianapolis City-County Council for four years. He is the father of seven children. Roger, Jr., Stacie Hicks, Rodney, Malissa Brown, Gayle Brown, Destiny Brown and Roger. He was diagnosed with colon cancer in 1996 and died the following year.

References

External links
Career Stats @ basketball-reference.com

1942 births
1997 deaths
Amateur Athletic Union men's basketball players
American athlete-politicians
American men's basketball players
Banned National Basketball Association players
Basketball coaches from New York (state)
Basketball players from New York City
Deaths from cancer in Indiana
Deaths from liver cancer
Indiana Pacers players
Indiana Republicans
Indianapolis City-County Council members
Memphis Sounds players
Naismith Memorial Basketball Hall of Fame inductees
National Basketball Association players with retired numbers
New York (state) Republicans
Parade High School All-Americans (boys' basketball)
Shooting guards
Small forwards
Sportspeople from Brooklyn
Utah Stars players